Yuan Hong (328?–376?), courtesy name Yanbo, was a scholar, historian and politician from the Eastern Jin. He was born in Zhoukou, Henan, and served as an advisor to generals Xie Shang and Huan Wen on a number of military campaigns.

While on one of the latter general's campaigns, Yuan was asked to compose an official document. While leaning against his horse, he managed to complete seven pages, which led to the chengyu yǐmǎkědài.

Yuan is best known for his literary works, especially the Annals of the Later Han, which served as the basis for the more famous Book of Later Han by Fan Ye. An original collection of works by him, in thirty volumes, is no longer extant. Around twenty poems and essays have been preserved.

References

See also
Book of Later Han

328 births
376 deaths
Jin dynasty (266–420) historians
4th-century Chinese historians